The Soviet designation Project 10750 Code name: Sapfir ( for Sapphire, NATO - designation: Lida class) is a class of small minesweeper of the Soviet and Russian navies, which was developed to search for sea mines in port entrances, ports and rivers. Nine vessels were built by the Soviet Union and later by Russia from 1986 for the Russian Navy. Since then, the construction of eight more has started.

Description

Hull and sonar 
The hulls of Project 10750 are made of fiberglass, have a double bottom and are divided into nine watertight compartments.

To search for underwater contacts, a dome with a Kabarga-A1 sonar is built into the hull. On the aft of the ship there is a working platform on which a 5.3-tonne crane is mounted, with which the search robot and minesweeping gear can be brought in and out.

Armament 
 
The boats are armed with a 30 mm turret AK-306 on the forecastle. In addition, two Strela-2 anti-aircraft missiles can be used against flying targets. Four sea mines along with KIU-1 Luch or KIU-2M Anakonda mine searcher-and-destroyer or GKT-3-MO contact sweep, AT-6 acoustic sweep or SEMT-1 electromagnetic sweep, AT-6 acoustic sweep or 2x200 meters of the detonation cord can be carried.

Export 
 
In addition to project 10750, the variant Project 10750E MCM was planned for export to Kazakhstan, of which at least one boat was built. The boats are equipped with two  MAN D2866 diesels instead of the three engines on the Russian boats, have only two propellers, carry different sensors and communication equipment and are equipped with two 12.7 mm Kord machine guns armed.

Whereabouts 
Nine Project 10750 boats were completed for the Russian Navy by 1996; the construction of six boats is said to have started since then. Originally 26 ships were planned, but were never started due to financing problems. Two boats were decommissioned until 2014.

See also
List of active Russian Navy ships
List of ships of Russia by project number
List of minesweeper classes

References

Literature 
 Ю.В.Апальков:  Корабли ВМФ СССР. Том IV - Десантные и минно-тральные корабли.  Saint Petersburg, 2007, .

External links 
 Project 10750 at russianships.info (English)

Minesweepers of Russia
Mine warfare vessel classes
Minesweepers of the Russian Navy